The Bright Side is the second album by American singer Meiko, released through Fantasy Records on May 15, 2012. It is her first album under the Concord Music Group label. The lead single, "Stuck on You", was used in a 2012 Crate and Barrel nationwide ad campaign, their first in five years.

Track listing
 "Stuck on You" (3:06)
 "I'm in Love" (3:46)
 "When the Doors Close" (3:50)
 "Thinking Too Much" (3:36)
 "Leave the Lights On" (4:08)
 "Lie to Me" (3:40)
 "I'm Not Sorry" (3:16)
 "Let It Go" (3:46)
 "Real Real Sweet" (3:45)
 "Good Looking Loser" (3:56)
 "I Wonder" (3:36)

Charts

Album

Singles

References

Fantasy Records albums
2012 albums
Meiko (American singer) albums
Folktronica albums